Joseph Salvatore Gilbert (born June 5, 1976) is an American retired professional boxer, attorney, and sports agent. He was a Republican candidate in the 2022 Nevada gubernatorial Republican primary, finishing second behind Joe Lombardo.

Biography
Gilbert was born in Chicago and raised in Sparks, Nevada. Gilbert earned a Bachelor of Arts degree in English literature and political science from the University of Nevada. Gilbert spent six months living, training and traveling in northern Europe during the summer and fall of 1998 through a study abroad program based in Turin.

Gilbert was a collegiate fighter at the University of Nevada, National Champion from 1998 through 2000 (named outstanding boxer all 3 years), a four-time Regional Champion, a four-time All American, and was the Nevada State Golden Gloves Super Middleweight Champion in 2000.

Gilbert earned a Juris Doctor from Thomas Jefferson Law School in San Diego, California, and passed the Nevada bar exam in 2004. He has practiced law since that time in numerous areas; however, he focuses on criminal and civil trial practice and specific areas of sports and entertainment law. His law firm, Joey Gilbert & Associates, focuses on many aspects of criminal defense including personal injury, DUI defense, workers compensation, criminal law and immigration law.

Gilbert participated in the January 6, 2021 riot at the US Capitol to overturn the 2020 election results and has denied that President Joe Biden won the election.

Gilbert is the Director of Strategy for America's Frontline Doctors. Gilbert spread has driven distrust in the efficacy of PPE and vaccines.

In June 2021, Gilbert announced he was running for Governor of Nevada in the 2022 election. Gilbert placed second and lost in the Republican primary to Clark County Sheriff Joe Lombardo who won handily; despite this, he made baseless claims of election fraud and challenged the results.

Boxing career

Gilbert began boxing as an amateur at the University of Nevada, Reno. During his time at the University of Nevada, Gilbert was a three-time National Champion, a four-time Regional Champion, a four-time All American, and was the Nevada State Golden Gloves Super Middleweight Champion in 2000. He finished his amateur career with a record of 27–1.

In 2004, Gilbert was cast on NBC's reality TV show The Contender. He was placed on the West Coast Team and beat Jimmy Lange in the first round of this competition. He then had his friend turned rival Jesse Brinkley place him in a fight against Peter Manfredo Jr. in the quarter finals, which he lost in a divided decision. The fight was stopped in the fifth round due to an accidental head-butt from his opponent.

After The Contender, Gilbert won a six-round unanimous decision in the super middleweight division against James North on the undercard of the Jeff Lacy vs. Scott Pemberton card. Gilbert won the rematch with Jimmy Lange at the EagleBank Arena for the vacant middleweight NABO title on February 18 and won the WBC-USNBC middleweight title shortly after.

On September 21, 2007, Gilbert scored a first-round knockout over Charles Howe, however, the ruling was later changed to a no-decision. Gilbert was suspended by the Nevada Athletic Commission after testing positive for a number of illegal substances including a steroid, methamphetamine and amphetamine resulting from testing conducted before and after the fight. Nevada State Athletic Commission Executive Director Keith Kizer told Channel 2 Sports Director J.K. Metzker that Gilbert tested positive for illegal substances in urine tests taken before and after Gilbert's September 21 middleweight title fight against Charles Howe at the Grand Sierra Resort.

On August 12, 2008, Gilbert agreed to pay a $10,000 fine for a positive steroid test as part of a settlement with the Nevada Athletic Commission which included dropping the charges for amphetamine, methamphetamine, oxazepam, diazepam and nordiazepam in exchange for the fine and a one-year retroactive suspension.

On February 14, 2009, Gilbert challenged former rival Jesse Brinkley for the WBC USNBC super middleweight title, but was defeated by unanimous decision.

After suffering a six-round technical knockout loss to former IBF light middleweight champion Kassim Ouma, Gilbert retired from professional boxing in 2010 and now practices criminal defense and personal injury law in Reno, Nevada.

Professional boxing record

References

External links
Joey's Personal Website
Joey's Law Firm

Gubernatorial Website

1976 births
American people of Italian descent
American male boxers
Living people
Middleweight boxers
The Contender (TV series) participants
Protesters in or near the January 6 United States Capitol attack